Archives of Biochemistry and Biophysics is a biweekly peer-reviewed scientific journal that covers research on all aspects of biochemistry and biophysics.

History 
The journal was established in 1942 by Academic Press as the Archives of Biochemistry, obtaining its current name in 1952. It absorbed the journal Molecular Cell Biology Research Communications (formerly section B of Biochemical and Biophysical Research Communications), which was published from 1999 to 2001. An index to authors for the first 75 volumes, covering the period from 1943 to 1958, was published in October 1959.

Abstracting and indexing 
The journal is abstracted or indexed in Biological Abstracts, Chemical Abstracts, Current Contents/Life Sciences, EMBASE, EMBiology, Excerpta Medica, Genetics Abstracts, MEDLINE, and the Science Citation Index. According to the Journal Citation Reports, the journal has a 2020 impact factor of 4.013.

References

External links 

Elsevier academic journals
Biophysics journals
Publications established in 1942
Biochemistry journals
Biweekly journals